Too Much Sun is a 1990 American comedy film directed by Robert Downey Sr. and starring Robert Downey Jr., Eric Idle, Andrea Martin, Allan Arbus, Ralph Macchio and Howard Duff. It was filmed in Beverly Hills and Los Angeles, California, USA.

Plot

A multi-millionaire is making out his will. His son is gay and his daughter a lesbian, yet he vows to leave his fortune to the first one who can produce a grandchild.

Cast
Allan Arbus as Vincent
Robert Downey Jr. as Reed Richmond
Howard Duff as O. M.
Laura Ernst as Susan
Lara Harris as Sister Ursula
Jim Haynie as Father Kelly
James Hong as Frank Sr.
John Ide as Yacht Captain
Eric Idle as Sonny
Marin Kanter as Tiny Nun
Jon Korkes as Fuzby Robinson
Ralph Macchio as Frank Jr.
Christopher Mankiewicz as the mailman
Andrea Martin as Bitsy
Leo Rossi as George
Jennifer Rubin as Gracia
Cara Sherman as Waitress
Heidi Swedberg as Sister Agnes

External links

1990 films
American comedy films
1990 comedy films
Films directed by Robert Downey Sr.
CineTel Films films
1990 LGBT-related films
American LGBT-related films
LGBT-related comedy films
1991 comedy films
1991 films
1990s English-language films
1990s American films